Neal Scanlan (born 1961) is a British special effects artist and make-up artist, best known for his work on the Star Wars sequel trilogy and Anthology films. He won an Academy Award for Best Visual Effects for Babe in 1996.

Selected filmography 
 Charlie and the Chocolate Factory (2005)
 Sweeney Todd: The Demon Barber of Fleet Street (2007)
 Prometheus (2012)
 Star Wars: The Force Awakens (2015)
 Rogue One: A Star Wars Story (2016)
 Star Wars: The Last Jedi (2017)
 Solo: A Star Wars Story (2018)
 Jurassic World: Fallen Kingdom (2018)
 Star Wars: The Rise of Skywalker (2019)

Television 
 Tweenies – Animatronic Heads
 The Paz Show – Animatronic heads and bodies
 Fimbles – Animatronic heads, Fat suits and Puppets
 Dead Ringers – Fat Suits and Animation Heads (Fake CBeebies Segments)
 The Shiny Show – Puppets (Tigs and Dogsby)
 The Roly Mo Show – Puppets (alongside Neil Sterenberg)
 LazyTown Full Sized Puppets (alongside Wit Puppets)
 CBeebies – Special Effects, Puppets and Props
 Andor – Creature & droid effects

References

External links 
 

Living people
1961 births
Best Visual Effects Academy Award winners
Best Visual Effects BAFTA Award winners
Special effects people
Date of birth missing (living people)
People from Cheshire (before 1974)
British make-up artists